Ben Rhydding is a village in the City of Bradford, West Yorkshire, England.  It is part of the Ilkley urban area and civil parish.

The village is situated on a north-facing valley side beneath the Cow and Calf rocks and above and to the south of the River Wharfe. It was in the historic West Riding of Yorkshire.

History
The village's former name was Wheatley. In the 19th century it was noted for its hydropathic establishment that opened on  29 March 1844 at a cost of £30,000. It was the third major hydropathic establishment in England, "perhaps the most deeply respected and certainly the longest-lived". Ben Rhydding, the name given to the establishment, also given to the railway station built to serve it and by which the village subsequently became known, is allegedly the ancient name of the uplands above Wheatley. In a 1900 history of Upper Wharfedale, a footnote describes the circumstances, citing Collyer's History of Ilkley:

Amenities

Ben Rhydding is served by a railway station, public house, two petrol stations, two churches and local shops but relying on nearby Ilkley for shopping and civic facilities.

Ben Rhydding Hockey Club are located at Countances Way, with Men's and Women's teams competing in the England Hockey leagues.

Location grid

See also
Listed buildings in Ilkley

References

External links 

 Conservation Area Assessment for Ben Rhydding, dated 2003, from the City of Bradford Metropolitan District Council
 Memorials from Ben Rhydding, by John Pringle Nichol, published by Charles Gilpin, 1852
 Ben Rhydding: the principles of hydropathy and the compressed air bath, by 'A graduate of the Edinburgh university', published by Hamilton Adams & Co, 1858
 Ben Rhydding described in Black's Picturesque Tourist of Scotland, 1861, from Google Book Search
 Ben Rhydding: the Asclepia of England, by Rev. R. Woodrow Thomson, published by John Shuttleworth, 1862
 .

Villages in West Yorkshire
Wharfedale
Geography of the City of Bradford
Ilkley